Etna (Aetna) is an unincorporated community located in the town of New Diggings, in Lafayette County, Wisconsin, United States. It lies at an elevation of 758 feet (231 m). Originally named Aetna, a local legend has it that a lime kiln representing the spouting of the Sicilian Mount Etna stood on the spot of the community.

Notes

Unincorporated communities in Lafayette County, Wisconsin
Unincorporated communities in Wisconsin